Reginald Laverne Sanders (born December 1, 1967) is a former right fielder in Major League Baseball. He batted and threw right-handed. He played professionally with the Cincinnati Reds, St. Louis Cardinals, Pittsburgh Pirates, Atlanta Braves, San Francisco Giants, San Diego Padres and Kansas City Royals, and was a member of the Arizona Diamondbacks' 2001 World Series championship over the New York Yankees.

Early career
Sanders was 23 years old when he made his major league debut on August 22, after being selected in the seventh round of the  amateur draft by the Cincinnati Reds.

Baseball career
Sanders gained some notoriety during the 1994 season when Pedro Martínez hit him with a pitch to end his bid for a perfect game with one out in the eighth inning. Sanders responded by charging the mound and igniting a bench-clearing brawl. He was ridiculed by some in the press for believing that a pitcher would abandon an attempt at a perfect game to intentionally hit a batter.

On August 20, 2003, Sanders became the fortieth player in MLB history to hit two home runs in an inning, doing so for the Pittsburgh Pirates against the St. Louis Cardinals in the top of the 5th inning.  He was only the third Pirates player to accomplish the feat.  Sanders' first home run of the inning came as the third in a back-to-back-to-back string for the Pirates; the second was a grand slam.

With the Cardinals, Sanders had a breakout of sorts during the 2005 National League Division Series against the San Diego Padres. In a three-game sweep of the Padres, Sanders had 10 runs batted in, a new record for a division series. In Game 1 of the 2005 NLCS, Sanders hit a two-run home run to give the Cardinals a two-run lead, making it his seventh career postseason home run. However, the Cardinals would lose the series in six games, giving the Houston Astros their first NL pennant and trip to the World Series. 

On June 10, as a member of the Royals, Sanders hit his 300th home run. This made him the fifth member of Major League Baseball's 300-300 club, as he had stolen the 300th base of his career on May 1. He became the first player in history to join the club at his home stadium. Steve Finley of the San Francisco Giants joined the 300-300 club as its sixth member on June 14, four days after Sanders achieved the feat. Sanders hit 20 or more home runs in one season for six different  teams. He hit at least 10 home runs in a season for every major league team he played for (seven in all).

Sanders missed the majority of the 2007 season due to an injury and became a free agent after the season.

Career statistics

In 64 postseason games, Sanders batted .195 (43-for-221) with 24 runs, 7 home runs, 25 RBI, 9 stolen bases and 26 walks.

See also

List of Major League Baseball career home run leaders
List of Major League Baseball career runs scored leaders
List of Major League Baseball career stolen bases leaders

References

External links

1967 births
Living people
Baseball players from Atlanta
Baseball players from Cincinnati
Baseball players from South Carolina
Baseball players from Phoenix, Arizona
Sportspeople from Florence, South Carolina
Major League Baseball right fielders
Arizona Diamondbacks players
Cincinnati Reds players
Pittsburgh Pirates players
St. Louis Cardinals players
San Francisco Giants players
Atlanta Braves players
Kansas City Royals players
San Diego Padres players
National League All-Stars
African-American baseball players
Billings Mustangs players
Greensboro Hornets players
Cedar Rapids Reds players
Chattanooga Lookouts players
Indianapolis Indians players
Tucson Sidewinders players
American Methodists
Spartanburg Methodist Pioneers baseball players